Oliver Goss (born 12 April 1994) is an Australian professional golfer. He is from Fremantle, Western Australia.

Goss won the 2012 John Hughes Geely Nexus Risk Services Western Australia Open Championship on the PGA Tour of Australasia while still an amateur.

Goss was runner-up in the 2013 U.S. Amateur. He was the only amateur golfer to make the cut at the 2014 Masters Tournament and thus received low amateur honors.

Goss turned professional after the 2014 U.S. Open and made his professional debut at the next week's Travelers Championship.

Amateur wins
2011 Handa Australia Cup
2012 WA Amateur

Professional wins (1)

PGA Tour of Australasia wins (1)

PGA Tour of Australasia playoff record (1–0)

References

External links

Australian male golfers
Tennessee Volunteers men's golfers
Golfers from Melbourne
1994 births
Living people